Karl Van Roy (December 1, 1938 – May 10, 2022) was an American politician in the state of Wisconsin.

Born in Green Bay, Wisconsin, Van Roy graduated from St. Norbert College. He served in the United States Army from 1962 to 1964. Van Roy served in the Wisconsin State Assembly from 2003 until his retirement in 2013. Van Roy died on May 10, 2022, at the age of 83.

References

1938 births
2022 deaths
Politicians from Green Bay, Wisconsin
Republican Party members of the Wisconsin State Assembly
Military personnel from Wisconsin
St. Norbert College alumni
21st-century American politicians